The Year of the Tiger is a 2011 Chilean drama film directed by Sebastián Lelio about a prison inmate trying to find his family after the 2010 Chile earthquake.

Cast
 Luis Dubó
 Sergio Hernández
 Viviana Herrera

References

External links
 

2011 films
2011 drama films
2010 Chile earthquake
Chilean drama films
Films directed by Sebastián Lelio
2010s Spanish-language films
2010s Chilean films